Sturisoma guentheri is a species of armored catfish endemic to Peru where it occurs in the upper Amazon basin.  This species grows to a length of  SL.

References
 

Sturisoma
Fish of South America
Freshwater fish of Peru
Fish described in 1904